Concacaf CFU and UNCAF eliminations for the 2012 CONCACAF Women's U-17 Championship

CFU

First CFU round

Group A

Group B

Group C

Group D

Second CFU round 

  Bahamas
  Trinidad and Tobago
  Guyana
  Jamaica

Group Final

UNCAF

First UNCAF round 

|}

First leg

Second leg

Final round 

|}

First leg

Second leg

Panama qualified for the 2012 CONCACAF Women's U-17 Championship.

References

Qualification
2012 in youth sport
2012